The 2018 Vancouver International Film Festival (VIFF) took place from September 27 to October 12, 2018.

Awards
The festival award winners were announced on October 12.

Programmes

Galas
The Hummingbird Project — Kim Nguyen (Opening)
The Front Runner — Jason Reitman (Closing)

Special Presentations
Anthropocene: The Human Epoch — Jennifer Baichwal, Nicholas de Pencier, Edward Burtynsky
Boy Erased — Joel Edgerton 
Can You Ever Forgive Me? — Marielle Heller
Cold War — Paweł Pawlikowski
Colette — Wash Westmoreland
Everybody Knows — Asghar Farhadi
The Favourite — Yorgos Lanthimos
The Grizzlies — Miranda de Pencier
The Happy Prince — Rupert Everett
Non-Fiction — Olivier Assayas
The Old Man and the Gun — David Lowery
A Private War — Matthew Heineman
Shadow — Zhang Yimou
Sharkwater Extinction — Rob Stewart
Shoplifters — Hirokazu Kore-eda
The Sisters Brothers — Jacques Audiard

Special Events
VIFF Trbute Award: Jean-Marc Vallée, with screening of Dallas Buyers Club
An Evening with Jane Goodall, with screening of Jane
Bethune: The Making of a Hero — Phillip Borsos

ALT
Another Day of Life — Raúl de la Fuente, Damian Nenow
Climax — Gaspar Noé
The House That Jack Built — Lars von Trier
Level 16 — Danishka Esterhazy
Mega Time Squad — Tim Van Dammen
One Cut of the Dead — Shin'ichirô Ueda
Parallel — Isaac Ezban
Profile — Timur Bekmambetov
Relaxer — Joel Potrykus
Ruben Brandt, Collector — Milorad Krstić
Seder-Masochism — Nina Paley
Under the Silver Lake — David Robert Mitchell
Virus Tropical — Santiago Caicedo
The Wolf House — Cristobal León & Joaquín Cociña

Modes
Hi I Need to Be Loved — Marnie Ellen Hertzler
The Hymns of Muscovy — Dimitri Venkov
Julio Iglesias's House — Natalia Marin
LHB — Charlotte Prodger
Lost Head & the Bird — Sohrab Hura
The Rare Event — Ben Rivers, Ben Russell
A Room with a Coconut View — Tulapop Saenjaroen
Unearthing. In Conversation — Belinda Kazeem-Kaminski
The White Elephant — Shuruq Harb

Gateway
14 Apples — Midi Z
Ala Changso — Sonthar Gyal
Asako I & II — Ryūsuke Hamaguchi
Ash Is Purest White — Jia Zhangke
Burning — Lee Chang-dong
An Elephant Sitting Still — Hu Bo
A Family Tour — Ying Liang
Father to Son — Hsiao Ya-Chuan
Girls Always Happy — Yang Mingming
Grass — Hong Sang-soo
It's Boring Here, Pick Me Up — Ryuichi Hiroki
Jinpa — Pema Tseden
A Land Imagined — Yeo Siew Hua
Long Day's Journey Into Night — Bi Gan
Lush Reeds — Yang Yishu
Manta Ray — Phuttiphong Aroonpheng
Microhabitat — Jeon Go-woon
Mirai — Mamoru Hosoda
Mori, The Artist's Habitat — Shuichi Okita
Nervous Translation — Shireen Seno
No. 1 Chung Ying Street — Derek Chiu
People's Republic of Desire — Hao Wu
The Running Actress — Moon So-ri
The Scythian Lamb — Daihachi Yoshida
The Seen and Unseen — Kamila Andini
The Third Wife — Ash Mayfair
Wangdrak's Rain Boots — Lhapal Gyal

Impact
Central Airport THF by Karim Aïnouz
Chris the Swiss by Anja Kofmel
Cuban Food Stories by Asori Soto
Dawnland by Adam Mazo, Ben Pender-Cudlip
The Devil We Know by Stephanie Soechtig
The Distant Barking of Dogs by Simon Lereng Wilmont
Dolphin Man: The Story of Jacques Mayol by Lefteris Charitos
Dreaming Under Capitalism by Sophie Bruneau
Eldorado by Markus Imhoof
The Image You Missed by Donal Foreman
In My Room by Ayelet Albenda
Inside My Heart by Debra Kellner
Jane by Brett Morgen
John McEnroe: In the Realm of Perfection by Julien Faraut
The Lost City of the Monkey God by Bill Benenson
The Oslo Diaries by Mor Loushy, Daniel Sivan
Piazza Vittorio by Abel Ferrara
Putin's Witnesses by Vitaly Mansky
Samouni Road by Stefano Savona
The Serengeti Rules by Nicolas Brown
Shirkers by Sandi Tan
The Silence of Others by Almudena Carracedo, Robert Bahar
Theatre of War by Lola Arias
The Washing Society by Lizzie Olesker, Lynne Sachs
What Comes Around by Reem Saleh
Wine Calling by Bruno Sauvard

M/A/D
Bathtubs Over Broadway by Dava Whisenant
Bergman - A Year in a Life by Jane Magnusson
Blue Note Records: Beyond the Notes by Sophie Huber
Carmine Street Guitars by Ron Mann
The Eyes of Orson Welles by Mark Cousins
Garry Winogrand: All Things Are Photographable by Sasha Waters Freyer
Impulso by Emilio Belmonte
Jamilia by Aminatou Echard
Le Grand Bal by Laetitia Carton
The Man Who Stole Banksy by Marco Proserpio
Maria by Callas by Tom Volf
Matangi/Maya/M.I.A. by Stephen Loveridge
Minute Bodies: The Intimate Lives of F. Percy Smith by Stuart A. Staples
O Horizon by The Otolith Group
The Price of Everything by Nathaniel Kahn
The Proposal by Jill Magid
United Skates by Dyana Winkler, Tina Brown
The Whistleblower of My Lai by Connie Field
Yellow Is Forbidden by Pietra Brettkelly

Contemporary World Cinema
3 Faces — Jafar Panahi
Ága — Milko Lazarov
All Good (Alles ist gut) — Eva Trobisch
Amateurs (Amatörer) — Gabriela Pichler
Ben Is Back — Peter Hedges
Barefoot (Po strništi bos) — Jan Svěrák
Becoming Astrid (Unga Astrid) — Pernille Fischer Christensen
Bel Canto — Paul Weitz
Birds of Passage — Ciro Guerra, Cristina Gallego
Capernaum — Nadine Labaki
Carmen & Lola (Carmen y Lola) — Arantxa Echevarría
The Dead and the Others — João Salaviza, Renée Nader Messora
Dear Son — Mohamed Ben Attia
Diamantino — Gabriel Abrantes, Daniel Schmidt
Diane — Kent Jones
Djon Africa — Filipa Reis, João Miller Guerra
Dovlatov — Aleksei German
Dressage — Pooya Badkoobeh
Fugue — Agnieszka Smoczyńska
Garden Store: Suitor — Jan Hřebejk
The Guilty — Gustav Möller
Hat-Trick — Ramtin Lavafi
The Heiresses — Marcelo Martinessi
Hendi and Hormoz — Abbas Amini
Holiday — Isabella Eklöf
In My Room — Ulrich Köhler
In the Aisles — Thomas Stuber
In the Shadows — Dipesh Jain
Jonathan — Bill Oliver
Last Summer — Jon Jones
Leto — Kirill Serebrennikov
Liquid Truth — Carolina Jabor
The Load — Ognjen Glavonić
Mug — Małgorzata Szumowska
No One Will Ever Know — Jesús Torres Torres
Patrimony — Jiří Vejdělek
Petra — Jaime Rosales
Pity — Babis Makridis
The Reports on Sarah and Saleem — Muayad Alayan
Shock Waves — Ursula Meier, Lionel Baier, Frédéric Mermoud, Jean-Stéphane Bron
Sir — Rohena Gera
The Snatch Thief — Agustin Toscano
Sofia — Meryem Benm'Barek-Aloïsi
Styx — Wolfgang Fischer
Transit — Christian Petzold
Volcano — Roman Bondarchuk
What They Had — Elizabeth Chomko
The Wild Pear Tree — Nuri Bilge Ceylan
Winter Flies — Olmo Omerzu
Woman at War — Benedikt Erlingsson
Working Woman — Michal Aviad
Yomeddine — Abu Bakr Shawky

Spotlight on France
At War (En guerre) — Stéphane Brizé
Coincoin and the Extra-Humans (Coincoin et les z'inhumains) — Bruno Dumont
The Image Book (Le Livre d'image) — Jean-Luc Godard
Keep an Eye Out (Au poste!) — Quentin Dupieux
Memoir of War (La douleur) — Emmanuel Finkiel
A Paris Education (Mes provinciales) — Jean-Paul Civeyrac
The Prayer (La prière) — Cédric Kahn
Shéhérazade — Jean-Bernard Marlin
Sorry Angel (Plaire, aimer et courir vite) — Christophe Honoré

Focus on Italy
Daughter of Mine (Figlia mia) — Laura Bispuri
Dogman — Matteo Garrone
Euphoria (Euforia) — Valeria Golino
Happy as Lazzaro (Lazzaro felice) — Alice Rohrwacher
Love and Bullets (Ammore e malavita) — Manetti Bros.
Nome di donna — Marco Tullio Giordana
Piazza Vittorio — Abel Ferrara
Sicilian Ghost Story — Fabio Grassadonia, Antonio Piazza

Vanguard
Communion Los Angeles — Adam R. Levine, Peter Bo Rappmund
The Flower (La Flor) — Mariano Llinás
The Grand Bizarre — Jodie Mack
Introduzione all'oscuro — Gastón Solnicki
Notes on an Appearance — Ricky D'Ambrose
Quantification Trilogy — Jeremy Shaw
Ray & Liz — Richard Billingham
What You Gonna Do When the World's on Fire? — Roberto Minervini

Sea to Sky
Anthem of a Teenage Prophet — Robin Hays
Because We Are Girls — Baljit Sangra
The Darling — Lee Seung-Yup
Edge of the Knife — Gwaai Edenshaw, Helen Haig-Brown
Finding Big Country — Kathleen Jayme
Freaks — Zach Lipovsky and Adam Stein
In the Valley of Wild Horses — Trevor Mack, Asia Youngman
Kingsway — Bruce Sweeney
N.O.N. — Zebulon Zang
Picking Up the Pieces: The Making of the Witness Blanket — Cody Graham and Carey Newman
This Mountain Life — Grant Baldwin
When the Storm Fades — Seán Devlin

True North
Clara — Akash Sherman
Everything Outside — David Findlay
The Far Shore — Joyce Wieland
Firecrackers — Jasmin Mozaffari
Genesis (Genèse) — Philippe Lesage
Giant Little Ones — Keith Behrman
Mouthpiece — Patricia Rozema
The New Romantic — Carly Stone
Quiet Killing — Kim O'Bomsawin
Roads in February (Les routes en février) — Katherine Jerkovic
A Sister's Song — Danae Elon
Splinters — Thom Fitzgerald
Through Black Spruce — Don McKellar
Ville Neuve — Félix Dufour-Laperrière
What Is Democracy? — Astra Taylor
What Walaa Wants — Christy Garland

Future//Present
Fausto by Andrea Bussmann
M/M by Drew Lint
Mangoshake by Terry Chiu
The Museum of Forgotten Triumphs — Bojan Bodružić
Song of a Seer — Aïda Maigre-Touchet
Spice It Up — Lev Lewis, Yonah Lewis, Calvin Thomas
The Stone Speakers — Igor Drljaca
Waiting for April — Olivier Godin

Canadian Short Films
7A — Zachary Russell
Acres — Rebeccah Love
Animal Behaviour — Alison Snowden, David Fine
Best Friends Read the Same Books — Matthew Taylor Blais
Biidaaban (The Dawn Comes) — Amanda Strong
Broken Bunny — Meredith Hama-Brown
La Cartographe — Nathan Douglas
Century — Levi Holwell, Gabe Romero
Compete — Emmanuelle Lacombe
A Dreaming House — Devin Shears
Encore — Connor Gaston, Vaughn Gaston
EXIT — Claire Edmondson
Fauve — Jérémy Comte
From Across the Street and Through Two Sets of Windows — Steven McCarthy
Girl on a Bus — Matthew B. Schmidt
Glitter's Wild Woman — Danielle Roney
Guts — Nano Clow
Haus — Joseph Amenta
Hazel Isle — Jessica Johnson
Hole — G. Goletski
Loretta's Flowers — Brendan Prost
The Lure of the Deep — Larissa Corriveau
Mahalia Melts in the Rain — Émilie Mannering
Medical Drama — Sophie Jarvis
My Life Is a Joke — Chelsea McMullan, Sarafina Difelice
Paddock — Michel Kandinsky
Paseo — Matthew Hannam
Prawn — Andrew Gillingham
Pumpkin Movie — Sophy Romvari
The Subject — Patrick Bouchard
Titanyum — Gökçe Erdem
Train Hopper — Amélie Hardy
Turbine — Alex Boya
Under the Viaduct — Norm Li
The Urge to Run a Lap — Lesley Loksi Chan
Veslemøy's Song — Sofia Bohdanowicz
Woman in Stall — Madeleine Sims-Fewer, Dusty Mancinelli

International Shorts
Akeda (The Binding) — Dan Bronfeld
Anointed — Dan Lin
Aquarium — Lorenzo Puntoni
The Beetle at the End of the Street — Joan Vives Lozano
Bodies — Laura Nagy
Boy Saint — Tom Speers
Coming of Age — Doug Tompos
Dawn — Jörn Threlfall
Eli — Colin Gerrard
Exit Toll — Mohammad Najarian Dariani
First Generation — Jeannie Nguyen
Gerry — Victoria Hollup, Paul Agar
Green — Suzanne Andrew Correa
Hard Rubbish — Stephen Packer
In Lucia's Skin — Marya Hermosillo, Angel De Guillermo
The Light Refracts Into the Shadows — Tsung Hsuan Yeh
Mamartuile — Alejandro Saevich
Matria — Alvaro Gago
Mino Bimaadiziwin — Shane McSauby
Open House — Philip Aceto
Open Your Eyes — Ilay Mevorach
Password: Fajara — Séverine Sajous, Patricia Sanchez Mora
A Picnic Table at Dusk — Sheridan O'Donnell
Precious — Mohammed Hammad
The Racer — Alex Harron
Seen from Above — Patrick Brooks
Shadow Animals — Jerry Carlsson
Skates — Maddelin McKenna
Sorceress — Max Blustin
Theo & Celeste — Hanna Dougherty
Trophy Boy — Emrhys Cooper
Yesterday or the Day Before — Hugo Sanz
You Don't Know Me — Rodrigo Sellos

Youth Shorts
Big Girls Don't Cry — Rebecca Shapass
The Bunny Odyssey — Taerang Yun
Foreign — Timothy Ross
Gary, Mary, Barry and Craig — Carissa Clarkson, Rani Li, Ben Cockell, Sylvie Hopkins, Owen Liu
Gift — Yohann Grignou
Gone Astray — Mabel Ye
If Teardrops Were Pennies — Tiana Bates, Alexandria Sayers
iRony — Radheya Jegatheva
Jasmine Stung — Partho Gupte
Little Jerusalem — Monika Navickaite
Matriarch Rising — Helen Motts Tommy, Savannah M., Kelly Yellowbird, Shaina W. and Jenna Quock
My Clayey Conception — Zanyar Muhammadineko
Pulse — Gage Oxley
Rami & Mohammed's Story — Khaled Ahmed, Mohamed B., Rami Al Mitwali, Fouad Hammoud
Replica — Han Pham
Slurp — Anya Martin
Somethings — Shira Haimovici
Squats — Karina Jesson
Urban Poetry — Anton Guttenberg

Shorts airing with features
ante mis ojos — Lina Rodriguez
Carlotta's Face — Valentin Riedl
Caterpillarplasty — David Barlow-Krelina
A Fortress — Miryam Charles
The Great Wall of China — Aleksandra Odic
The Harvesters — Derek Howard
Holy Angels — Jay Cardinal Villeneuve
In the Valley of the Wild Horses — Trevor Mack, Asia Youngman
Roy Thomson — Sofia Bohdanowicz
The Soft Space — Sofia Bohdanowicz, Melanie Scheiner
Three Atlas — Miryam Charles
Where — Sofia Bohdanowicz

References

External links
Official site (from Internet Archive Wayback Machine, archived during the 2018 festival)
 VIFF 2018 Factsheet (archived from official site)
 Closing release including official list of award winners

2018 film festivals
2018 in British Columbia
2010s in Vancouver
2018 in Canadian cinema
2018